Ethyl isopropyl ketone (2-methyl-3-pentanone) is an aliphatic ketone with used as a reagent in organic chemistry and as a solvent.

Its fully fluorinated analog is known as Novec 1230 and is used in gaseous fire suppression.

References

Hexanones
Ketone solvents